Lee Kuan-yi (born 9 September 1996) is a Taiwanese tennis player.

Lee has a career high ATP singles ranking of 447 achieved on 30 January 2017. He also has a career high ATP doubles ranking of 523 achieved on 24 October 2016. Lee has won 2 ITF singles title and 3 ITF doubles titles.

Lee has represented Chinese Taipei at the Davis Cup where he has a W/L record of 2–2.

External links

1996 births
Living people
Taiwanese male tennis players
Sportspeople from Taipei
Universiade medalists in tennis
Universiade gold medalists for Chinese Taipei
Medalists at the 2017 Summer Universiade
21st-century Taiwanese people